Parc Berthiaume-Du-Tremblay is a park located in Chomedey, a suburb of Laval, Quebec, Canada a short distance from Montreal Island. It has a football/soccer stadium, Berthiaume-Du-Tremblay Stadium, and a baseball stadium.

References

Sports venues in Quebec
Tourist attractions in Laval, Quebec
Parks in Quebec